Scaffold attachment factor B, also known as SAFB, is a gene with homologs that have been studied in humans and mice.

Function 

This gene encodes a DNA-binding protein that has specificity for scaffold or matrix attachment region DNA elements (S/MAR DNA). This protein is thought to be involved in attaching the base of chromatin loops to the nuclear matrix but there are conflicting views as to whether this protein is a component of chromatin, the nuclear matrix, or both. Scaffold attachment factors are a subset of nuclear matrix proteins (NMP) with enriched binding  to AT-rich S/MAR sequences. The SAF-B protein is thought to serve as a molecular base to assemble a 'transcriptosome complex' in the vicinity of actively transcribed genes. It is involved in the regulation of the heat shock protein 27 transcription and also can act as an estrogen receptor corepressor. This gene is a candidate gene for breast tumorigenesis.

Interactions 

SAFB has been shown to interact with:
 Estrogen receptor alpha, 
 HNRPD,
 SAFB2,  and
 TAF15.

References

Further reading